Garvestone (or Garveston) is a village and former civil parish, now in the parish of Garvestone, Reymerston and Thuxton, in the Breckland district, in the county of Norfolk, England.

History
Garveston's name is of Anglo-Saxon and Viking origin and derives from an amalgamation of the Old English and Old Norse for Geirulfr's settlement or farmstead.

In the Domesday Book, Garveston is listed as a settlement of 27 households in the hundred of Mitford. In 1086, the village was part of the East Anglian estates of Henry de Ferrers.

Geography
According to the 2011 Census, the parish of Garvestone, Reymerston and Thuxton has a population of 660 residents living in 285 households.

Garvestone falls within the constituency of Mid Norfolk and is represented at Parliament by George Freeman MP of the Conservative Party. For the purposes of local government, the parish falls within the district of Breckland.

St. Margaret's Church
Garvestone's church tower dates from Fourteenth Century and is built in the Perpendicular style. The font dates from the Sixteenth Century and holds a stained-glass window depicting the crucifixion of Christ which dates from the 1890s.

Civil parish 
On 1 April 1935 the parishes of Reymerston and Thuxton were merged with Garveston, on 4 August 1999 the merged parish was renamed "Garvestone, Reymerston & Thuxton". In 1931 the parish of Garveston (prior to the merge) had a population of 265.

Notable Residents
 Edward Wright (1561-1615)- English mathematician and cartographer

War Memorial
The war memorial for Garvestone and Thuxton takes the form of a rough-hewn stone cross with a two-stepped plinth, located in St. Margaret's Churchyard. The memorial lists the following men for both villages for the First World War:
 L-Cpl. Sidney E. Jowlings (1894-1917), 7th Bn., Royal Norfolk Regiment
 Gnr. Algernon H. Easlea (1886-1918), 99th (Siege) Bty., Royal Garrison Artillery
 Pvt. George Stocking (d.1916), 2nd Bn., Royal Berkshire Regiment
 Pvt. Colin L. Whitehand (1899-1918), 8th Bn., East Surrey Regiment
 Percy Howard
 Harry Newson
 W. Read
 Jesse Ward

And, the following for the Second World War:
 Pvt. C. George Softley (1919-1943), 4th Bn., Royal Norfolk Regt.
 Pvt. Robert Frost (1906-1940), Royal Pioneer Corps
 Ernest Greenwood
 James Mann
 George Richardson

References

External links

Villages in Norfolk
Former civil parishes in Norfolk
Breckland District